Yelena Yevgenyevna Shalygina (born 15 December 1986 in Shymkent) is a Kazakh wrestler. She competed in the 63 kg weight class at the 2008 Summer Olympics, where she won a bronze medal.

At the 2008 Summer Olympics, she lost to Alena Kartashova in the last 16, but because Kartashova reached the final, Shalygina was able to compete in the repechage where she beat Elina Vaseva and then Lise Golliot-Legrand to win her bronze medal.

At the 2012 Summer Olympics she lost to Yuliya Ostapchuk in the first round.

She won the gold medal in the 65 kg event at the 2021 Islamic Solidarity Games held in Konya, Turkey. She competed in the 65 kg event at the 2022 World Wrestling Championships held in Belgrade, Serbia.

References

External links
 

Kazakhstani female sport wrestlers
Olympic bronze medalists for Kazakhstan
Olympic wrestlers of Kazakhstan
Wrestlers at the 2008 Summer Olympics
Wrestlers at the 2012 Summer Olympics
1986 births
Living people
Olympic medalists in wrestling
Kazakhstani people of Russian descent
Asian Games medalists in wrestling
Wrestlers at the 2006 Asian Games
Wrestlers at the 2010 Asian Games
Medalists at the 2008 Summer Olympics
World Wrestling Championships medalists
Medalists at the 2010 Asian Games
Asian Games gold medalists for Kazakhstan
Asian Wrestling Championships medalists
People from Shymkent
Islamic Solidarity Games medalists in wrestling
Islamic Solidarity Games competitors for Kazakhstan
21st-century Kazakhstani women